Akim Lvovich Volynsky (Аким Львович Волынский, real name Khaim Leybovich Flekser, Хаим Лейбович Флексер; 3 May 1861 – 6 July 1926) was a Russian literary (later theatre and ballet) critic and historian, one of the early ideologists of the Russian Modernism.

Early life
Born into a Jewish family, his identity would play a role in his future artistic endeavors.

Career
Volynsky came to prominence in 1890—1895 with a series of essays published by Severny Vestnik of which he later became the co-editor. His 1896 book Russian Critics which targeted figures like Nikolai Chernyshevsky and Nikolai Dobrolyubov, later in its turn evoked  Georgy Plekhanov's scathing criticism. It was followed by another seminal compilation, Fighting for Idealism (Борьба за идеализм, 1900). Among Akim Volynsky's notable books were Leonardo da Vinchi (1900) and F.M. Dostoyevsky (1906); the former drew accusations of plagiarism, as Volynsky the editor has apparently used in it the materials collected by Dmitry Merezhkovsky.

After the 1917 Revolution Volynsky stayed in the Soviet Russia. In 1920-1924 he was a chairman of the Leningrad section of the  Writers' Union and for a while headed the Leningrad School of Choreography. His treatise Book of Joys. The Alphabet of the Classic Dance came out in 1925.

References 

Russian Jews
Russian critics
Russian editors
Writers from Zhytomyr
People from Kiev Governorate
1861 births
1926 deaths